Terry Sloane is a fictional superhero appearing in DC Comics, and the first character named Mister Terrific. He first appeared in Sensation Comics #1 (January 1942).

Fictional character biography
Terry Sloane was a rich man whose photographic memory, Olympic-level athletic skills, and mastery of the martial arts made him a virtual Renaissance man. After graduating college at age thirteen, he eventually became a renowned business leader in the community. Having accomplished all of his goals by the time he was in his early 20s, Terry felt there were no challenges left for him to pursue, leading him towards suicidal tendencies. However, upon seeing a young woman jump from a bridge, Sloane reacted quickly and saved her. He learned her name was Wanda Wilson. Sloane assisted her brother, who had been caught up in a gang, by creating the Mister Terrific persona. He then designed the "Fair Play Club" to stymie growing juvenile delinquency.

Sometimes nicknamed "The Man of 1,000 Talents", Terry Sloane turned to crimefighting after excelling at everything else. He wore a red suit with a green tunic. A golden emblem on his tunic proclaimed his motto, "Fair Play". 

According to Jess Nevins' Encyclopedia of Golden Age Superheroes, "his Rogues Gallery includes Black Barax, the Tyrant from the Year 7532; Dr. Laff, who uses practical jokes like itching powder and poisonous snakes to commit crimes; the Five Geniuses, five talented men who commit crimes to entertain themselves; and Terry Savatte, a tap dancing savate master".

Mister Terrific became a reserve member of the Justice Society of America, taking part in two of their chronicled 1940s adventures. He also was a full-fledged member of the All-Star Squadron and assisted both teams on several more occasions throughout the remaining decade, retiring along with his peers in 1951.

Sloane resumed his crimefighting career, at which point he was given full status as a member of the Justice Society. On several occasions he assisted them in various cases, such as combating the Lawless League and the Black Orb crime gang.

Sloane made an appearance in Justice League Year One, at the first gathering of the League. He was seen being looked after by Phantom Lady during a gathering of heroes on Blackhawk Island, after the final defeat of the alien Apellaxian army.

Sloane came out of retirement to pursue his old nemesis, the Spirit King. The Spirit King took control of the Golden Age Flash and used him to kill Sloane.

After death
After his death, Sloan has appeared in the afterlife and via time travel. About once a year, during the run of writer James Robinson's superhero title, Starman, title character Jack Knight had a supernatural visit from his deceased brother, David, under the recurring title "Talking With David". One year, David showed up with several other dead heroes, including Mister Terrific. They had a dinner party in the black-and-white realm. During his visits, the motivations for heroics and vigilantism were discussed.

Through time travel, Sloane and his successor, Michael Holt, have met. Sloane, Holt's JSA, and the Freedom Fighters of Sloane's time teamed up to stop a rampaging, highly destructive time traveler. In the past, the villain had already damaged many parts of Washington D.C., killing many, but they were able to defeat him when Sloane tricked the time traveller into thinking that he was the time traveller's ancestor, threatening to shoot himself before he could have any children to cut the other man's family history short (Although he later admitted that he was bluffing as it would be impossible to determine a family connection given the numerous generations between Sloane and the time traveller). Despite the JSA trying to be secretive, Sloane figured out much about their mission and methods.

Sloane made another post-death appearance in the Day of Judgement series. A team of heroes attempted to break into Heaven to persuade Jim Corrigan to retake the mantle of the Spectre. Sloane and other dead heroes appeared to try and gently dissuade the heroes from their mission.

Sloane joined forces with Holt once again when time-traveler Per Degaton launched an attack on the JSA in 1951 with the intention of framing the now-disbanded team for the destruction of Washington and the death of the President of the United States. Time-traveler Rip Hunter was able to prevent this by recruiting key members of the future JSA to recruit their more troubled predecessors to take action, Holt learning more about Sloane's family history during his time in the past.

During the "Blackest Night" storyline, Sloane is reanimated as part of the Black Lantern Corps. He is one of many JSA-associated Black Lanterns to attack the current JSA in New York City. The corpses are destroyed by a unique device created by the current Mister Terrific.

A panel in "The New Golden Age" one-shot revealed that Mister Terrific had a sidekick named Quiz Boy who became his sidekick sometime after Mister Terrific defeated Spirit King and had a friendly competition of knowledge. Quiz Boy helped Mister Miracle on his adventures until 1946 when Quiz Boy mysteriously vanished while he and Mister Terrific were investigating the mysterious disappearances of Betsy Ross and Molly Pitcher.

Powers and abilities
Terry Sloane had no superhuman powers, but he was a master martial artist and an Olympic-level athlete with a genius-level intellect. He also possessed photographic memory allowing him to remember important clues and information.

Relatives and friends
The Golden Age Mister Terrific was said to be a favorite of author Michael Chabon, who contributed a story about Sloane to the JSA mini-series All-Stars in 2003. According to Chabon's story, Sloane was the protector of Gateway City and had a brother named Ned, a butler simply named Butler, and a doorman named Smitty. In the Chabon story, Ned Sloane was portrayed as an alcoholic, compulsive gambler who has the "power to hit bottom, and then, somehow, keep on falling".

It has been established that Terrific's brother Ned was the grandfather of the Modern Age criminal Roulette; however, in her original appearance, Roulette believed for unknown reasons that Terrific himself was her grandfather and regarded the new Mister Terrific as a pretender to the role. During a separate time-travel adventure, Michael Holt helps Sloane after he has abducted Ned's daughter from the original Roulette's lair, refusing to allow his niece to grow up in a den of gamblers. It can be inferred that Sloane adopted his niece, thus explaining Roulette's assumption that Sloane is her grandfather.

A character named Ms. Terrific was introduced in the 1989 series Hero Hotline as a member of the group's night shift team. Although her outfit was based on Terry Sloane's costume, it is unknown if she had any connection to him.

Other versions

JSA: The Liberty File
A version of Terry Sloane was portrayed in JSA: The Liberty File and its sequel JSA: The Unholy Three. Here, Terry Sloane was portrayed as a World War II intelligence agent transferred to desk duty, until the untimely death of his fiance by the story's version of the Scarecrow. He was seen wearing a variation of the classic "Fair Play" costume and using a rapier.

The Golden Age
Sloane was mentioned in The Golden Age Elseworlds story as having retired from crime fighting and is now running an airline. Unconfirmed rumors suggest he acquired this using underhanded tactics.

Earth 2
In September 2011, The New 52 rebooted DC's continuity. In this new timeline, Terry Sloan (no "e") is re-established on Earth 2. He attacks Michael Holt, the Mister Terrific of Earth-0 (the main DC Universe as of 2011) after he is teleported to Earth-2. Sloan was featured as the Mister Terrific of Earth-2. In issue 0 of Earth 2, Terry Sloane was revealed as one of Earth 2's original eight superheroes, a hyper-intelligent operative known as Mr. 8 who fell from grace after he destroyed areas the forces of Apokolips had invaded and became his world's worst supervillain. In a flashback, Terry Sloan found Val-Zod

Following the "Convergence" storyline, Dick as the new Batman  was pursuing Terry Sloane. Terry Sloane escaped with the help of Johnny Sorrow. After regaining conscious from crashing into a searchlight, Batman is greeted by Flash and Huntress as Doctor Impossible shows up. Batman finally catches up to Terry Sloane who has gained access to a terraformer from the Source Vault which he plans to turn the new world into a replica of Earth 2. When Slone's spire is destroyed, the Wonders of the World found Terry Sloan dead and the Genesis device stolen. In a flashback that's part of a story that Val-Zod tells to Batman and Flash, a woman named Anarky attacked causing Sloan to send his Sandmen to combat her. He was later confronted by Val-Zod and Power Girl. Once the story was over, Batman tries to recruit Val-Zod into helping to find Terry Sloan's killer.

In other media

Television
 Terry Sloane appears in the Smallville episode "Absolute Justice" in a painting hanging in the Justice Society of America hall.
 The original Mister Terrific appears in Batman: The Brave and the Bold.
 Terry Sloane is mentioned in the Arrow episode "A Matter of Trust" by Curtis Holt. While wrestling, Terry (known as Mr. Terrific) wears an outfit with the words "Fair Play" on it indicating his lack of need to cheat to win.

Homages
In Alan Moore's Top 10, in one scene, among a pile of knocked out people is a person that wears a costume that looks like Terry Sloane's, but has "Xtra Play" on his belt instead of "Fair Play".

Collected editions
Mr. Terrific is one of seven JSA-related heroes whose earliest solo appearances are collected in an anthology entry in the DC Archive Editions series:

References

External links
Mr. Terrific at Don Markstein's Toonopedia. Archived from the original on March 10, 2016.
JSA Fact File: Mister Terrific I
Earth-2 Mister Terrific Index

Comics characters introduced in 1942
DC Comics martial artists
DC Comics superheroes
Earth-Two
Golden Age superheroes

sv:Mister Terrific